The Richardson House is a historic house located at 1603 1st Avenue, West in the Point Pleasant neighborhood of Bradenton, Florida.

Description and history 
Built in 1924, it was the home of Bentham S. Richardson and his wife Harriet (Birney) Richardson.  On January 8, 2003, it was added to the National Register of Historic Places.

References

External links

 Manatee County listings at National Register of Historic Places

Bradenton, Florida
Houses on the National Register of Historic Places in Florida
National Register of Historic Places in Manatee County, Florida
Houses in Manatee County, Florida
Houses completed in 1924
Bungalow architecture in Florida